Ceremonial ship launching involves the performance of ceremonies associated with the process of transferring a vessel to the water. It is a nautical tradition in many cultures, dating back thousands of years, to accompany the physical process with ceremonies which have been observed as public celebration and a solemn blessing, usually but not always, in association with the launch itself.

Ship launching imposes stresses on the ship not met during normal operation and, in addition to the size and weight of the vessel, represents a considerable engineering challenge as well as a public spectacle. The process also involves many traditions intended to invite good luck, such as christening by breaking a sacrificial bottle of champagne over the bow as the ship is named aloud and launched.

Methods
There are three principal methods of conveying a new ship from building site to water, only two of which are called "launching". The oldest, most familiar, and most widely used is the end-on launch, in which the vessel slides down an inclined slipway, usually stern first. With the side launch, the ship enters the water broadside. This method came into use in the 19th century on inland waters, rivers, and lakes, and was more widely adopted during World War II. The third method is float-out, used for ships that are built in basins or dry docks and then floated by admitting water into the dock.

If launched in a restrictive waterway, drag chains are used to slow the ship speed to prevent it striking the opposite bank.

Stern-first

Normally, ways are arranged perpendicular to the shore line (or as nearly so as the water and maximum length of vessel allows) and the ship is built with its stern facing the water. Where the launch takes place into a narrow river, the building slips may be at a shallow angle rather than perpendicular, even though this requires a longer slipway when launching. Modern slipways take the form of a reinforced concrete mat of sufficient strength to support the vessel, with two "barricades" that extend well below the water level taking into account tidal variations. The barricades support the two launch ways. The vessel is built upon temporary cribbing that is arranged to give access to the hull's outer bottom and to allow the launchways to be erected under the complete hull. When it is time to prepare for launching, a pair of standing ways is erected under the hull and out onto the barricades. The surface of the ways is greased. (Tallow and whale oil were used as grease in sailing ship days.) 
A pair of sliding ways is placed on top, under the hull, and a launch cradle with bow and stern poppets is erected on these sliding ways. The weight of the hull is then transferred from the build cribbing onto the launch cradle. Provision is made to hold the vessel in place and then release it at the appropriate moment in the launching ceremony; common mechanisms include weak links designed to be cut at a signal and mechanical triggers controlled by a switch from the ceremonial platform.

On launching, the vessel slides backwards down the slipway on the ways until it floats by itself.

Sideways

Some slipways are built so that the vessel is side-on to the water and is launched sideways. This is done where the limitations of the water channel would not allow lengthwise launching, but occupies a much greater length of shore. The Great Eastern designed by Brunel was built this way, as were many landing craft during World War II. This method requires many more sets of ways to support the weight of the ship.

Air-bag

Sometimes ships are launched using a series of inflated tubes underneath the hull, which deflate to cause a downward slope into the water. This procedure has the advantages of requiring less permanent infrastructure, risk, and cost. The airbags provide support to the hull of the ship and aid its launching motion into the water, thus this method is arguably safer than other options such as sideways launching. These airbags are usually cylindrical in shape with hemispherical heads at both ends.

History

Ancient
 
A Babylonian narrative dating from the 3rd millennium BC describes the completion of a ship:

Openings to the water I stopped;
I searched for cracks and the wanting parts I fixed:
Three sari of bitumen I poured over the outside;
To the gods I caused oxen to be sacrificed.

Egyptians, Greeks, and Romans called on their gods to protect seamen. Favor was evoked from the monarch of the seas—Poseidon in Greek mythology, Neptune in Roman mythology. Ship launching participants in ancient Greece wreathed their heads with olive branches, drank wine to honor the gods, and poured water on the new vessel as a symbol of blessing. Shrines were carried on board Greek and Roman ships, and this practice extended into the Middle Ages. The shrine was usually placed at the quarterdeck, an area which continues to have special ceremonial significance.

Different peoples and cultures shaped the religious ceremonies surrounding a ship launching. Jews and Christians customarily used wine and water as they called upon God to safeguard them at sea. Intercession of the saints and the blessing of the church were asked by Christians. Ship launchings in the Ottoman Empire were accompanied by prayers to Allah, the sacrifice of sheep, and appropriate feasting.

Chaplain Henry Teonge of Britain's Royal Navy left an interesting account of a warship launch, a "briganteen of 23 oars," by the Knights of Malta in 1675:
Two fryers and an attendant went into the vessel, and kneeling down prayed halfe an houre, and layd their hands on every mast, and other places of the vessel, and sprinkled her all over with holy water. Then they came out and hoysted a pendent to signify she was a man of war; then at once thrust her into the water.

Early Modern Age

The liturgical aspects of ship christenings, or baptisms, continued in Catholic countries, while the Reformation seems to have put a stop to them for a time in Protestant Europe. By the 17th century, for example, English launchings were secular affairs.  The christening party for the launch of the 64-gun ship of the line  in 1610 included the Prince of Wales and famed naval constructor Phineas Pett, who was master shipwright at the Woolwich yard. Pett described the proceedings:

The "standing cup" was a large cup fashioned of precious metal. When the ship began to slide down the ways, the presiding official took a ceremonial sip of wine from the cup, and poured the rest on the deck or over the bow. Usually the cup was thrown overboard and belonged to the lucky retriever. As navies grew larger and launchings more frequent, economy dictated that the costly cup be caught in a net for reuse at other launchings. Late in 17th century Britain, the standing-cup ceremony was replaced by the practice of breaking a bottle across the bow.

By country

Launching could be said to mark the birth of a vessel; and people throughout history have performed launching ceremonies, in part to appeal for good fortune and the safety of each new vessel.

Canada
In Canada, Aboriginal peoples will perform ceremonies at the launching of vessels along with other methods of launching.

France
French ship launchings and christenings in the 18th and early 19th centuries were accompanied by unique rites closely resembling marriage and baptismal ceremonies. A godfather for the new ship presented a godmother with a bouquet of flowers as both said the ship's name. No bottle was broken, but a priest pronounced the vessel's name and blessed it with holy water.

India
In India, ships have historically been launched with a Puja ceremony that dedicates the ship to a Hindu god or goddess, and seeks blessings for her and her sailors. Historically, Hindu priests would perform the puja ceremony at launch. In the 20th century, ships are launched with a lady breaking a coconut on the bow of the vessel, which is sometimes followed by a small Puja.

Japan
Japanese ship launchings incorporate silver axes which are thought to bring good luck and scare away evil. Japanese shipbuilders traditionally order the crafting of a special axe for each new vessel; and after the launching ceremony, they present the axe to the vessel's owner as a commemorative gift.  The axe is used to cut the rope which tethers the ship to the place where she was built.

United Kingdom

Sponsors of British warships were customarily members of the royal family, senior naval officers, or Admiralty officials. A few civilians were invited to sponsor Royal Navy ships during the nineteenth century, and women became sponsors for the first time. In 1875, a religious element was returned to naval christenings by Princess Alexandra, wife of the Prince of Wales, when she introduced an Anglican choral service in the launching ceremony for battleship . The usage continues with the singing of Psalm 107 with its special meaning to mariners:

They that go down to the sea in ships;
That do business in great waters;
These see the works of the Lord, and His wonders in the deep.

In 1969, Queen Elizabeth II named the ocean liner Queen Elizabeth 2 after herself, instead of the older liner , by saying, "I name this ship Queen Elizabeth the Second. May God bless her and all who sail in her." On 4 July 2014, the Queen named the Royal Navy's new aircraft carrier  with a bottle of single malt Scotch whisky from the Bowmore distillery on the island of Islay instead of champagne because the ship had been built and launched in Scotland. The Duchess of Rothesay similarly launched  by pulling a lever which smashed a bottle of single malt Scotch whisky at the side of the ship.

Shipyard ephemera is a rich source of detail concerning a launch and this was often material produced for the audience of the day and then thrown away. Tyne & Wear Archives & Museums has many of these items from Tyne and Wear shipyards. A number can be seen in Commons. The 1900 piece for  reproduced in this article lists a woman performing the launch.

United States

Ceremonial practices for christening and launching ships in the United States have their roots in Europe. Descriptions are not plentiful for launching American Revolutionary War naval vessels, but a local newspaper detailed the launch of Continental frigate  at Portsmouth, New Hampshire, in May 1776:

It was customary for the builders to celebrate a ship launching. They voted the sum of fifty dollars to the master builder of each yard "to be expended in providing an entertainment for the carpenters that worked on the ships." Five pounds was spent for lime juice for the launching festivities of frigate  at Philadelphia, Pennsylvania, suggesting that the "entertainment" included a potent punch with lime juice as an ingredient.

No mention has come to light of christening a Continental Navy ship during the American Revolution. These were former merchantmen, and their names were assigned during conversion and outfitting. Later, Congress authorized the construction of thirteen frigates, and no names were assigned until after four had launched.

Her sponsor was Captain James Sever, USN, who stood on the weather deck at the bow. "At fifteen minutes after twelve she commenced a movement into the water with such steadiness, majesty and exactness as to fill every heart with sensations of joy and delight." As Constitution ran out, Captain Sever broke a bottle of fine old Madeira over the heel of the bowsprit.

Frigate  had an interesting launching on April 10, 1800, at New York:

As the 19th century progressed, American ship launchings continued to be festive occasions, but with no set ritual except that the sponsor(s) used some "christening fluid" as the ship received her name.

Sloop of war  was launched in 1828 and was "christened by a young lady of Portsmouth." This is the first known instance of a woman sponsoring a United States Navy vessel. Unfortunately, the contemporaneous account does not name her. The first identified woman sponsor was Lavinia Fanning Watson, daughter of a prominent Philadelphian. She broke a bottle of wine and water over the bow of sloop-of-war  at Philadelphia Navy Yard on August 22, 1846.

Women as sponsors became increasingly the rule, but not universally so. As sloop-of-war  "glided along the inclined plane" in 1846, "two young sailors, one stationed at each side of her head, anointed her with bottles, and named her as she left her cradle for the deep."  As late as 1898, the torpedo boat  was christened by the son of the builder.

Seven years later, "a bottle of best brandy was broken over the bow of steam sloop ." Steam frigate  earned her place in naval history as Confederate States of America ironclad , and she was baptized with water from the Merrimack River. Admiral David Farragut's famous American Civil War flagship steam sloop  was christened by three sponsors; two young ladies broke bottles of Connecticut River water and Hartford, Connecticut spring water, while a naval lieutenant completed the ceremony with a bottle of sea water.

Champagne came into popular use as a christening fluid as the 19th century closed. The effects of national prohibition on alcoholic beverages were reflected to some extent in ship christenings. However, battleship  appropriately received her name with California wine in 1919. Champagne returned in 1922, but only for the launch of light cruiser .

The earliest First Lady of the United States to act as sponsor was Grace Coolidge who christened the airship Los Angeles. Lou Henry Hoover christened Akron in 1931, but the customary bottle was not used. Instead, the First Lady pulled a cord which opened a hatch in the airship's towering nose to release a flock of pigeons.

Thousands of ships of every description came off the ways during World War II, the concerted effort of a mobilized American industry. The historic christening and launching ceremonies continued, but travel restrictions, other wartime considerations, and sheer numbers dictated that such occasions be less elaborate than those in the years before the war. 

On 15 December 1941, the United States Maritime Commission announced that all formal launching ceremonies would be discontinued for merchant ships being constructed under its authority, though simple informal ceremonies could continue without reimbursement to builders.

In recent history, all U.S. Navy sponsors have been female. In addition to the ceremonial breaking of a champagne bottle on the bow, the sponsor remains in contact with the ship's crew and is involved in special events such as homecomings.

The sponsor will also receive a token of the launching. The bottle is wrapped in a yarn koozie before it is used in the ceremony, and this is mounted on a plaque (see image) which is given to them afterwards.

Incidents

  sank moments after her launching at a shipyard in Govan, Glasgow, Scotland on 3 July 1883. As Daphne moved into the river, the anchors failed to stop the ship's forward progress. The starboard anchor moved only , but the port anchor was dragged . The current of the river caught Daphne and flipped it onto its port side, sinking it in deep water. 124 died including many young boys, some of whose relatives were there on shore.
  launched on 21 June 1898. Albion created a wave with her entry into the water after the Duchess of York christened her. The wave caused a stage to collapse on which 200 people were watching; it slid into a side creek, and 34 people drowned, mostly women and children. This was probably one of the first-ever ship launchings to be filmed.
 In 1907, the Italian ocean liner  capsized and sank upon launch.
 In 2011, the luxury boat SS Jiugang sank at launch in Lanzhou, China.

See also
 Ship class naming conventions
 United States ship naming conventions
 Russian ship naming conventions
 Japanese ship-naming conventions
 Hull classification symbol
 Ship commissioning
 Ship sponsor
 Lists of ship launches

References

Further reading

 Rodgers, Silvia The symbolism of ship launching in the Royal Navy (1983) (PhD thesis)

External links

 Photos of the 8 Dec 1984 launching ceremony of the USS Samuel B. Roberts (FFsG 58)
 An online exhibit of ship launching ceremonies from the first half of the 20th Century
 Short video of ships being launched sideways

Beginnings
Ship launching
Nautical terminology
Rituals attending construction